Amrep Xmas is Unsane's first live album, released in 1997 through Man's Ruin Records. "Four Sticks" is a Led Zeppelin cover and appeared originally in their fourth album.

Reception

Patrick Kennedy from Allmusic wrote about the album: "It certainly captures the manic intensity of the band performing live, but there are a few glitches, including tape drop-outs, an ill-timed reel change, and some small errors in song execution."

Track listing
"Sick"
"Straight"
"Out"
"No Soul"
"Can't See"
"Booby Bomb"
"Test of Faith"
"Swim"
"Four Sticks"
"Empty Cartridge"
"Get Off My Back"
"Special Guest Appearance"

Personnel
Dave Curren - bass
Vincent Signorelli – drums
Chris Spencer – guitar, vocals
Dave Garnder - mixing, recording
Sharon Shelden - photography
Randy Hawkins - recording
Frank Kozik - sleeves

References

Unsane albums
1997 live albums
Man's Ruin Records live albums